Rune Schrøder (born 27 August 1995) is a Danish handball player for Cesson Rennes MHB.

Achievements 
 Swedish Handball League
Winner: 2021
 Swedish Handball Cup
Winner: 2022

References

1995 births
Living people
Danish male handball players
IK Sävehof players
Expatriate handball players
Danish expatriate sportspeople in Sweden
Danish expatriate sportspeople in France